Melah Tulat (also Romanized as Melah Tūlāt; also known as Melahtūt and Melah Tūt) is a village in Zamkan Rural District, in the Central District of Salas-e Babajani County, Kermanshah Province, Iran. At the 2006 census, its population was 14, in 4 families.

References 

Populated places in Salas-e Babajani County